The Shoreditch Twat fanzine was published and edited by club promoter Neil Boorman on behalf of the Shoreditch nightclub 333 between 1999 and 2004.

History 
Starting life as a listings magazine for the club, it quickly grew to become an irreverent, satirical fanzine at the centre of the creative boom in East London. Producing 25,000 copies every six weeks with funding from BAT, Anheuser-Busch and Diesel, Shoreditch Twat attracted writers from The Guardian, The Face, Arena, Loaded, ID and Sleazenation, and illustrators James Jarvis, Bump, Will Sweeney and Elliot Thoburn.

The Twat was art directed by Bump (John Morgan and Mike Watson), adding a surreal edge.

Hoxton resident Lida Hujic wrote:

In 2001, the term Shoreditch Twat became popular vernacular for an overdressed East London 'trendy' and the fanzine went on to produce an installation for the Barbican Gallery's UK culture exhibition 'Jam', which later toured to Japan.

Channel 4 Television and Talkback commissioned Shoreditch Twat to produce a one-off comedy under the amended title of Shoreditch Tw*t, and shown in the Comedy Lab strand on 31 October 2002. This programme went on to win a special mention at the 2003 Montreux Comedy Award.

After four years and 31 issues, Shoreditch Twat ran into legal difficulties and was forced to close down. The publisher went on to edit Sleazenation Magazine.

See also
Nathan Barley

References

External links
 Exhibition by Shoreditch Twat art directors

1999 establishments in the United Kingdom
2004 disestablishments in the United Kingdom
Local interest magazines published in the United Kingdom
Satirical magazines published in the United Kingdom
Defunct magazines published in the United Kingdom
Listings magazines
Magazines established in 1999
Magazines disestablished in 2004
Media and communications in the London Borough of Hackney
Shoreditch